Marina van der Rijk (31 October 1961 – 7 November 2012), known as Miggy, was a Dutch pop singer of the 1980s. She was born in Breda and died in Geleen. Her only hit was the novelty song 'Annie, which released in 1981.

References

1961 births
2012 deaths
Dutch pop singers
People from Breda